Robin's Nest is a British sitcom made by Thames Television, which aired on the ITV network for 48 episodes over six series from 11 January 1977 to 31 March 1981. It saw Richard O'Sullivan reprise the role of Robin Tripp, one of the lead characters in the sitcom Man About the House. It also starred Tessa Wyatt, Tony Britton and David Kelly.

Series overview

Episodes

Series 1 (1977)

Series 2 (1978)

Series 3 (1978)

Series 4 (1979)

Series 5 (1979–80)

Series 6 (1980–81)

References

External links
 

Robin's Nest